Luis Zayas may refer to:

Luis Zayas (athlete) (born 1997), Cuban high jumper
Luis Zayas (professor), American psychiatry professor